Stefan Adolf Mossor (23 October 1896, Kraków - 22 September 1957) was a Polish general. Member of the Polish Legions. 1928 - 1930 studied at École Supérieure de Guerre in Paris. In the Second Polish Republic he reached the rank of the lieutenant colonel. Taken prisoner by the Germans during the invasion of Poland.

Upon discovery of the Katyn massacre of Polish officers in the Soviet Union in 1943, Mossor still a POW was brought by the Germans to witness the opening of the mass graves. Upon this visit in August 1943, Mossor made a report for the Polish Commander in Chief general Kazimierz Sosnkowski.

Joined the Polish People's Army after the war in 1945; he was nominated deputy chief of the general staff. Mossor was the main one in the forced deportation of hundreds of thousands ethnic Ukrainians from Poland, which was named Operation Vistula. During the era of stalinization of Poland, he was arrested and sentenced in the Trial of the Generals. Imprisoned for life in Wronki Prison, he was released and rehabilitated in 1956.

References

1896 births
1957 deaths
Military personnel from Kraków
People from the Kingdom of Galicia and Lodomeria
Polish Austro-Hungarians
Polish People's Army generals
Polish legionnaires (World War I)
Polish people of the Polish–Soviet War
Polish military personnel of World War II
People detained by the Polish Ministry of Public Security
Polish People's Republic rehabilitations
Recipients of the Silver Cross of the Virtuti Militari
Recipients of the Order of the Cross of Grunwald, 3rd class
Knights of the Order of Polonia Restituta
Recipients of the Cross of Valour (Poland)
Recipients of the Gold Cross of Merit (Poland)
Recipients of the Silver Cross of Merit (Poland)
Recipients of the Cross of Independence
Commandeurs of the Légion d'honneur
Officiers of the Légion d'honneur
Burials at Powązki Military Cemetery